Volunteer Corps may refer to:

British Volunteer Corps – a British voluntary part-time organization for the purpose of home defence in the event of invasion, during the French Revolutionary and Napoleonic Wars.
SAF Volunteer Corps – Established in October 2014 as part of the Singapore Armed Forces to allow women, first generation permanent residents and new immigrants to join.
Hawaii Air Depot Volunteer Corp – a civilian paramilitary unit at Hickam Air Force Base, Hawaii during the World War II.
Jesuit Volunteer Corps – an organization of lay volunteers who dedicate one year or more to voluntary community service working with people in need.
Korean Women's Volunteer Labour Corps – an organization during the Pacific War
Macedonian-Adrianopolitan Volunteer Corps – a volunteer corps of the Bulgarian Army during the Balkan Wars.
Puerto Rican Volunteers Corps – a militia composed of private citizens, principally instituted for the defense of Puerto Rico's periphery from pirate incursions and foreign invasion.
Women's Army Volunteer Corp – an organization within the Women's Army Corps in which women could serve as office assistants or military bus drivers.